The 2017 CISM World Football Cup is the 2nd edition of the CISM World Football Cup and take part in Muscat, capital of Oman. Oman the hosts won the tournament for the first time, defeating Qatar 4–1 in a penalty shoot-out after the final finished goalless following extra time. Syria came third and Egypt fourth, while defending champions Iraq did not qualify.

Qualification

Venues

Squads

Match officials
The following referees were chosen for the 2017 CISM World Football Cup.

Referees

 Mohamed Benouza
 Ali Al-Samahiji
 Ibrahim Nour El Din
 Benoît Millot
 Stefan Treiber 
 Aboubacar Bangoura
 Mohamed Hossein Zahedifar 
 Eoghan O'Shea
 In-Chol Kang
 Kim Song Ho
 Khaled Al-Sheddi
 Zakri Nasser Hashil Al-Hinaai 
 Omar Al-Yaqoubi
 Qassim Al-Hatmi
 Yaqoub Abdul Baqi
 Marek Marcinkowski
 Saoud Ali Al Adba
 Adel Al-Naqbi
 Mohamad Abdulah
 Mohammed Al-Qarni
 Assetou Keita

Assistant referees

 Abdulla Al Rowaimi 
 Mahmoud Abu Elregal
 Yohann Tetart
 Michael Olligschläger
 Djeneba Dembele  
 Deckie Toland
 Hamed Al-Gafri 
 Nasser Ambusaidi
 Rashad Al-Hakmani 
 Ryszard Walendziak
 Saoud Ahmed Al-Maqaleh 
 Abdulah Al-Shalwai 
 Zakaria Kanat
 Abdullah Al-Naqbi 
 Azane Al-Qateti
 Hasan Zeheiri

Group stage
The teams are ranked according to points (3 points for a win, 1 point for a draw, 0 points for a loss). Group winners and runners-up advance to the quarter-finals.

All times are local, GST (UTC+4).

Group A

Group B

Group C

Group D

Knockout stage

Quarter-finals

Semi-finals

Third place play-off

Final

Statistics

Goalscorers
5 goals

 Ahmed El Sheikh
 Mohammed Al Wakid

4 goals

 Abdul Aziz Al-Muqbali
 Mohammed Taqi
 Abdul-Kader Ngom

3 goals

 Mohamed Amine Hamia
 Mateusz Łuczak

2 goals

 Abderrahmane Meziane
 Ismail Abdullatif
 Florian Stahl
 Derek Walsh
 Ricky Fox
 Amadou Diallo
 Sambou Sissoko
 Saud Al-Farsi
 Damian Kosiński
 Justice Odoi
 Mohammed Hamadko

1 goal

 Houari Ferhani
 Chamseddine Harrag
 Sofiane Khadir
 Ali Madan
 Stephen Sabadoz
 Ahmed Eid
 Amr Marey
 Paulo
 Ahmed Samy
 Salah Soliman
 Moamen Zakaria
 Kévin Dumontant
 Jawad El Hajri
 William Friedrich
 Abdelkader Mihoubi
 Andreas Dick
 Ibrahima Kassory Camara
 Adboulaye Sow
 Aliou Barry
 Ali Gholamrezapour
 Sean Gannon
 Mark Horgan
 Graig Shortt
 An Il-bom
 Sim Hyon-jin
 So Hyon-uk
 Adama Traoré
 Mohsin Al-Khaldi
 Juma Darwish
 Saad Al-Mukhaini
 Mohammed Al-Musalami
 Jameel Al-Yahmadi
 Qasim Said
 Marcina Żeno
 Mateusz Wachowiak
 Omar Ali
 Bréhima Keïta
 Luke Ndifon
 Jonathan Silva
 Zakaria Al-Kadoor
 Muayad Al-Khouli
 Osama Omari
 Caleb Downey
 Ramos Jesus

Awards
Highest Scorers
 Ahmed El Sheikh
 Mohammed Al Wakid

Man of the Competition
 Abdullah Al-Haddad

Best Goalkeeper
 Faiz Al-Rushaidi

Fair Play of the tournament

Tournament team rankings
As per statistical convention in football, matches decided in extra time are counted as wins and losses, while matches decided by penalty shoot-outs are counted as draws.

Media

Broadcasting

References

External links
 Official website of the competition
Official website of the CISM 

2017
2017 World Military Championship
2017